Triple-hybrid is a registered trademark (German Trademark DE 307 68 078, European Community trademark application CTM 010704237) of the German company Proton Motor Fuel Cell GmbH which is used to designate a special drive system that has been developed and patented by Proton Motor Fuel Cell GmbH (European Patent EP 1 868 837 B1). Other than conventional hybrid drive systems comprising only two sources of energy, namely a combustion engine and an electric motor, Proton Motor Fuel Cell's Triple-hybrid drive system comprises three sources of energy, namely hydrogen fuel cells, batteries, and ultracapacitors to power, store and capture energy during braking of vehicle.

Main Components 

In the special drive system developed by the captioned joint-venture project, the basic power source is a liquid-cooled proton exchange membrane fuel cell (Proton’s “PM Basic A 50” fuel-cell system). Lead-gel batteries and ultracapacitors are the additional power sources.

Modes of Operation 

Like other fuel cell powered vehicle, the proton exchange membrane fuel cell in this drive system uses hydrogen to produce electric power to motor. When the vehicle is stationary, the proton exchange membrane fuel cell recharges both the lead-gel batteries and the ultracapacitors.

During peak energy requirements the lead-gel batteries and ultracapacitors provide additional electric power, in parallel to the proton exchange membrane fuel cell, to the motor.

During braking, energy, the regenerative braking energy, is captured in the lead-gel batteries and the ultracapacitors.

External links 
 First 'triple-hybrid' fuel-cell bus goes into service, Society of Automotive Engineers, retrieved on 10-06-2009
 Proton Motor, Skoda Electric, UJV Collaborate on Fuel Cell Bus, HybridMile.com, 21-05-2009, Retrieved on 10-06-2009
 Proton Motor Fuel Cell GmbH

Automotive technologies
Hybrid vehicles
Hybrid powertrain